The Apostle Islands are a group of 22 islands in Lake Superior, off the Bayfield Peninsula in northern Wisconsin. The majority of the islands are located in Ashland County—only Sand, York, Eagle, and Raspberry Islands are located in Bayfield County. All the islands except for Madeline Island are part of the Apostle Islands National Lakeshore. The islands in Ashland County are all in the Town of La Pointe, except for Long Island, which is in the Town of Sanborn, while those in Bayfield County are in the Towns of Russell and Bayfield.

Environment
"The Apostle Islands National Lakeshore provides regionally diverse and unique plant communities." "Over 800 plant species occur within the lakeshore, including Wisconsin listed endangered and threatened species."  The Apostles are dominated by boreal forest, composed largely of white spruce (Picea glauca) and balsam fir (Abies balsamea), often mixed with white birch (Betula papyrifera), white cedar (Thuja occidentalis), white pine (Pinus strobus), balsam poplar (Populus balsamifera) and quaking aspen (Populus tremuloides). On Madeline Island, Stockton Island, and several other islands, a unique bog dune ecosystem can be found near deep bays and enclosed lagoons.

According to the National Park Service, "One of the greatest concentrations of black bears in North America is found on Stockton Island in the Apostle Islands National Lakeshore. Bears also regularly inhabit Sand and Oak islands, and, due to their mobility, may be found on just about any of the Apostle Islands."

"The Lakeshore provides important nesting habitat for the following colonial nesting birds: herring and ring-billed gulls, double-crested cormorants, great blue herons, and cliff swallows. Gull and Eagle Islands combined have 88% of the lakeshore's breeding herring gull populations and 80% of the herring gull breeding population on the entire Wisconsin shore of Lake Superior. Eagle Island has the only great blue heron rookery in the park."

Sea caves

Good examples of the sea caves of the Great Lakes are located on the shorelines of the Apostle Islands.  Examples include the following locations: Swallow Point on Sand Island, the North Shore of Devils Island, and near Mawikwe Bay on the mainland. Arches and delicate chambers are visible. During the winters, visitors can see frozen waterfalls and chambers filled with delicate icicles.

History
Though archeological finds have pointed to traces of human activity as early as 100BC, the earliest known full-time settlers to the islands were Anishinaabe peoples migrating from the east coast beginning in around 950AD, following the waterways comprising the established trade routes that had connected the eastern nations to western nations for thousands of years.  Details and stories of these migration were preserved in the birch bark scrolls, Some can now be seen being preserved in the Smithsonian Museum in Washington, D.C.  As these migrations continued west, they created several prominent settlements, but when the wild rice growing in the marshes of the shallow Chequamegon Bay, they made Mooningwanekaaning (now Madeline Island) their capital, with settlements on Stockton Island and Manitou Island as well as along the shoreline.

On and around these islands, the Ojibwa people discovered and innovated agricultural advancements, including excavating copper deposits and creating specialized tools for agriculture, hunting and fishing, the use of canoes in rice harvesting, conjugal collaborative farming, and the Three Sisters Crop Complex, enabling the Ojibwa to greatly expand their population, territory and power outward in all directions creating an enormous nation.  However, these rapid advances in technology, along with five more centuries of migration from the east, also caused divisive ideological disagreements over traditionalism, and ultimately, the Potowatomi, Ottawa, and other tribes split off, leaving the Ojibwe alone wielding full control over the entire Lake Superior region, with the Islands remaining their current power center, but all the many Mississippi nations' ancient cultural and spiritual home.

When the early French traders arrived around 1640, the capital city on Madeline Island was given the name La Pointe, and by 1693 it was fortified and included as an official Trading Post city in the Empire of New France, but with the westward expansion of European colonialism, conflicts boiled into formal wars from 1775 onward.  Over the next 35 years, as more and more Native populations were concentrated into increasingly smaller areas, these areas became unable to provide sustenance for the swelling populations, and in 1811, the recognized principal Chief Buffalo from La Pointe led an army of Ojibwa to fight in Tecumseh's War against the U.S..  However, he had a change of heart and pursued diplomacy when he met Michel Caddotte in Sault Ste Marie, who convinced him that by avoiding violence against the US, he could negotiate better treaties for the Ojibwa people.  Though the American flag was hoisted over the Islands in 1816, Chief Buffalo fought decades of the United States' government and mining and lumber capitalists continual and sometimes deadly efforts to completely remove the Ojibwe people, successfully securing permanent reserves of land including the mainland coastline nearest the Islands for the Red Cliff band, as well as entire reservations for other bands in the region.

The islands were renamed the Apostle Islands by New France historian Pierre François Xavier de Charlevoix, who renamed them after the 12 apostles (for the 12 largest islands).

In 2018, the Apostle Islands were chosen as Wisconsin's entry for the America the Beautiful quarters series.

Islands
All islands lie in the Town of La Pointe, in Ashland County, unless indicated otherwise.

Climate

See also
 Apostle Islands Lighthouses
 Apostle Islands National Lakeshore
 La Pointe, Wisconsin
 La Pointe (community), Wisconsin
 Big Bay State Park
 Islands of the Midwest
 List of islands of the United States
 Islands of the Great Lakes
 Populated islands of the Great Lakes
 Kechewaishke

References

External links

Friends of the Apostle Islands National Lakeshore web site
Madeline Island History Museum
 "A Unique Collection of Islands" book
 "Lake Superior Trials" public radio report

 
Islands of Lake Superior
Islands of Ashland County, Wisconsin
Landforms of Bayfield County, Wisconsin
Lake islands of Wisconsin